Lyes is a male given name. Notable people with this name include:

 Lyes Boukria (born 1981), Algerian football player
 Lyes Cherifi (born 1968), Algerian judoka
 Lyes Houri (born 1996), French football player
 Lyes Oukkal (born 1991), Algerian football player
 Lyes Ould Ammar (born 1983), Algerian volleyball player
 Lyes Salem (born 1973), Algerian actor and film director
 Lyès Bouyacoub (born 1983), Algerian heavyweight judoka
 Lyès Deriche (1928–2001), Algerian politician
 Lyès Saïdi (born 1987), Algerian football player

See also
 Lye